István Pukli (born October 1, 1979) is a Hungarian teacher of history and literature, esperantist, and the headmaster of the Teleki Blanka Gymnasium of Budapest. 

Pukli  was one of the leading figures of the 2016 teachers protests.

Career
He was the director of Teleki Blanka Gymnasium.

Publications

References 

Hungarian activists
Heads of schools in Hungary
Hungarian Esperantists
1979 births
Living people
Eötvös Loránd University alumni
Budapest University of Technology and Economics alumni